Edmé Bouchardon (29 May 169827 July 1762) was a French sculptor best known for his neoclassical statues in the gardens of the Palace of Versailles, his medals, his equestrian statue of Louis XV of France for the Place de la Concorde (destroyed during the French Revolution); and for the Fountain of Four Seasons in Paris. He was also a draftsman and painter, and made celebrated series of engravings of working-class Parisians.

Biography
Bouchardon was born in  Chaumont-en-Bassigny, the son of a sculptor and architect, Jean-Baptiste Bouchardon.  He learned sculpture first in the studio of his father, and then with Guillaume Coustou.  He won the Prix de Rome of the Académie royale de peinture et de sculpture in 1722, and as a consequence lived and worked in Rome from 1722 to 1732. He resisted the more ornate tendencies of the Rocaille style, and moved toward neoclassicism.  While in Rome, he specialized in busts of distinguished patrons, including Pope Benedict XIII. In 1726 he also began  a copy of the Barberini Faun a Classical Hellenic sculpture from the Barberini Palace in Rome.  His copy arrived in France in 1732, and was greatly admired, and aided  the transition of French sculpture toward neoclassicism. In 1775 the duc de Chartres bought it for his elaborate garden at Parc Monceau. It is now in the Louvre.

On his return to France, he was employed in the royal art workshops at the Palace of Versailles,  Working alongside his two brothers, he made statues for the Gardens of Versailles, including the statue of Proteus in the Basin of Neptune.  In his style, he resisted the flamboyant Rocaille style of his contemporaries, and tended toward more classical models.   Bouchardon sculpted  "Cupid Fashioning a Bow out of the Club of Hercules", now in the Louvre, for the Gardens of Versailles.  It depicted a realistic, unidealized adolescent Cupid in a natural posture, which was completely in contrast with the classical ideals.  He first presented the model in terra cotta at the 1739 Salon,  then a full-scale model in 1746. He was commissioned to make a marble version, which he created between 1747 and 1750. The work established his reputation, and also his fortune;  he was paid a remarkable 21,000 livres.

His last completed major sculptural work was the Fontaine des Quatre-Saisons on the Rue de Grenelle in Paris, commissioned in 1739, and completed six years later in 1745.  This work featured a classical colonnade, decorated with statuary. It was similar in its arrangement of statues made by Michelangelo in the Medici Chapel in Florence.   His sculpture was widely admired. It was featured, along with a fine engraving of the fountain,   in the article on classical sculpture by J. F. Blondel in the French Encyclopedia of 1765.   However, it also drew considerable criticism, the colossal sculptural work on a narrow street provided only a tiny trickle of water.  The project was criticized by Voltaire in a letter to the Count de Caylus in 1739, as the fountain was still under construction:

Bouchardon was commissioned to make one last major work, an equestrian statue of Louis XV for the Place de la Concorde, to commemorate France's victory in the War of Austrian Succession.  He died before the work was finished.  It was completed by Jean-Baptiste Pigalle, but was destroyed during the French Revolution.

Sculpture

Jetons
Bouchardon also designed jetons or metal tokens, which were distributed by the King. The subjects and themes were chosen by the Académie des Inscriptions et Belles-Lettres and passed through an elaborate process of critiques before approval, which involved the King himself. Drawings and counterproofs for these jetons are now held at various museums and collections around the world including the Institut de France, the Musée de la Monnaie, and the Bibliothèque nationale.

Family
Bouchardon's brother, Jacques-Philippe Bouchardon, was also a sculptor, who became first sculptor to the king of Sweden.

Drawings and etchings
Bouchardon was particularly skilled at drawing, and produced two series of drawings of working people in the streets of Paris.  His drawings, made with sanguine or reddish chalk, were originally used to make a series of smaller ceramic sculptures of Parisian characters, such as street vendors (see gallery).  Later they were made into a series of etchings  by the historian and engraver Anne Claude de Caylus, under the title Studies made of the Lower Class or the Cries of Paris. These became a very valuable source of information for later social historians.

References

Bibliography
 Gerhard Bissell, Bouchardon, Edme, in: Allgemeines Künstlerlexikon (Artists of the World), Vol. 13, Saur, Munich 1996, from p. 425 (in German). 
 Duby, Georges and Daval, Jean-Luc, La Sculpture de l'Antiquité au XXe Siècle, (French translation from German), Taschen, (2013),
 Geese, Uwe, Section on Baroque sculpture in L'Art Baroque – Architecture – Sculpture – Peinture (French translation from German), H.F. Ulmann, Cologne, 2015.

External links

 

1698 births
1762 deaths
People from Chaumont, Haute-Marne
18th-century French sculptors
French male sculptors
18th-century French painters
French male painters
Prix de Rome for sculpture
18th-century French male artists